The Individual Learning Accounts scheme was announced in the 1997 Labour Party manifesto to support adult education with a system of tax incentives from employers, as well as a cash contribution of £150 to each of a million individuals. The system was biased towards the uptake of information technology skills, following the emergence of the Internet.

Original scheme

The scheme was announced by the Chancellor of the Exchequer, Gordon Brown in the 1999 budget and was launched in 2000 in the form of financial reimburses to educational course providers for the cost of the ILA incentives.

By the time the scheme was abandoned in October 2001, there were 8,500 accredited providers nationwide. The Department for Education and Skills was investigating 279 providers on the basis of substantial evidence of misselling, and police had arrested 30 people.
 
Prosecutions based on this fraud were still taking place in 2008.

Capita was the contractor that implemented the payment scheme. Following its investigation, the Parliamentary Committee of Public Accounts reported that the total expenditure on the scheme exceeded £290million (£37million paid towards Capita) with fraud and abuse amounting to £97 million.

The fraudulent activity was in the form of obtaining learning account numbers from individuals or of buying them from corrupt providers and simply cashing the credit, knowing that there was virtually no chance that the fact that no education had been delivered would be detected. At the same time, the "students" were made to think they were getting a computer for free. This was generally a 4–5 year-old machine, in which a "study pack" had been installed in order to amount to education providing.

ILA Scotland

In 2004, the Scottish Executive launched ILA Scotland, to replace the original ILAs. This new scheme was managed by Learndirect Scotland and the Student Awards Agency for Scotland. The Scheme provided up to £200 per year for a variety of courses. ILAs were available for people with an income of £22,000 a year or less, who were not in full-time education or who are receiving benefits. In 2017, after consultations, the Scottish Government replaced ILAs with Individual Training Accounts, which are fully provided by Skills Development Scotland.

ILA Wales

The Welsh Assembly Government launched a replacement ILA scheme in 2003.
The ILA Wales scheme will be closed by 31 March 2011.

External links
 ILA Scotland

References

Education in the United Kingdom
Fraud in the United Kingdom
2000 introductions